Matija Gubec Stadium is a multi-purpose stadium in Krško, Slovenia.

The stadium was built in 1946 and has a capacity of 1,470 seats. It is currently used mostly for football matches and also hosts motorcycle speedway competitions since 1957, including the Speedway Grand Prix of Slovenia as part of the Speedway Grand Prix World Championship series. During speedway competitions the standing area surrounding the track is opened for public and therefore the race can be viewed by more than 10,000 individuals.

See also
List of football stadiums in Slovenia

References

Football venues in Slovenia
Multi-purpose stadiums in Slovenia
Krško
Speedway venues in Slovenia
Sports venues completed in 1946
NK Krško
1946 establishments in Slovenia